George Denholm Paterson (26 September 1914 – 25 December 1985) was a Scottish international footballer.

Paterson started his senior career at Celtic, where he won two Scottish league championships and the Scottish Cup once. He then served in the Royal Air Force during the Second World War, while playing as a guest for Leicester City, Blackpool, Wolverhampton Wanderers, Tranmere Rovers and Arsenal. Paterson's career with Celtic came to an end after he incurred a three-month suspension for vociferously arguing with the referee (whom he felt was under the influence of alcohol) during Celtic's 1946 Victory Cup semi-final against rivals Rangers. 

Paterson moved to England to sign for Brentford in a swap deal with Gerry McAloon, then became player-manager of Yeovil and Petters United. He then managed Stirling Albion for a season before working variously for Celtic as a reserve team trainer and a scout.

Personal life 
Paterson graduated from Glasgow University with an MA degree. At the time he signed for Brentford, Paterson was working as a technician at the London Film Company; he had a keen interest in the movie business. He later emigrated to New Zealand and died there in December 1985.

References

External links 

1914 births
1985 deaths
Scottish footballers
Scotland international footballers
Celtic F.C. players
Leicester City F.C. wartime guest players
Blackpool F.C. wartime guest players
Wolverhampton Wanderers F.C. wartime guest players
Tranmere Rovers F.C. wartime guest players
Arsenal F.C. wartime guest players
Brentford F.C. players
Yeovil Town F.C. players
Stirling Albion F.C. players
Scottish Football League players
English Football League players
Scottish football managers
Yeovil Town F.C. managers
Stirling Albion F.C. managers
Celtic F.C. non-playing staff
Scottish Football League representative players
Scottish Football League managers
Scotland wartime international footballers
Association football wing halves
Dunipace F.C. players
Scottish emigrants to New Zealand
Footballers from Falkirk (council area)
Scottish Junior Football Association players
Royal Air Force personnel of World War II
Alumni of the University of Glasgow
People from Denny, Falkirk